Sarnia 2/26 Battery was the name of a Canadian football team in Ontario Rugby Football Union. The team played in the 1940 season. The ORFU had several teams disband due to the war in 1940, and Sarnia 2/26 Battery was one of the teams quickly recruited for the 1940 season (at the instigation of Lt. Hugh Sterling.)

Notable players
Nick Paithouski

ORFU season-by-season

References

Ontario Rugby Football Union teams
Defunct Canadian football teams
Sport in Sarnia